Kuxa kanema, capítulos 1, 63, 262 is a documentary film.

Synopsis 
Three chapters of Kuxa Kanema, the daily film journal created during the first years of the Mozambique Republic. Graphic images of the utopia experienced by a young nation under construction, despite the lack of TV channels. Kuxa Kanema is the film school of the first generation of Mozambique filmmakers.

External links 

Mozambican documentary films
Documentary films about African cinema